Jacques Couture is a Canadian auto racer. He is known for opening North America's first racing school called Jim Russell Racing in Quebec which later expanded to California in multiple locations. Most all recent driving schools have been based on Jacques’ technique and original model for Jim Russell Racing in Canada and North America. He was inducted into the Canadian Motorsport Hall of Fame in 2000.  He has been credited as the "instructor who taught the young Gilles Villeneuve how to race." Jacques also created a mechanics training programme for aspiring race car mechanics in 1971. Jacques Couture won the 1971 Players (Canadian) Formula B Championship Series.

References
 

Living people
Year of birth missing (living people)
Canadian racing drivers